Vitrinobrachium is a genus of gastropods belonging to the family Vitrinidae.

The species of this genus are found in Central Europe.

Species:

Vitrinobrachium baccettii 
Vitrinobrachium breve 
Vitrinobrachium tridentinum

References

Gastropods